The 2008 Pan American Weightlifting Championships were held in Callao, Peru from 19 March to 23 March 2008.

Men's events

Women's events

Medal table

Notes and references 
 Results

P
Pan American Weightlifting Championships
Pan American Weightlifting Championships
Pan American Weightlifting Championships